Anna Teague (born 8 December 1987) is a retired Australian rules footballer who played for Melbourne and Geelong in the AFL Women's (AFLW).

AFLW career

Melbourne
Teague was drafted by Melbourne with the club's first selection and the sixth pick overall in the 2017 AFL Women's rookie draft. She made her debut in a 34-point loss to Collingwood at TIO Traeger Park in round 4 of the 2018 season.

Geelong
In May 2018, Teague accepted an offer from expansion club Geelong to play with the club in the 2019 season. In August 2020, Teague announced her retirement from football.

References

External links

1987 births
Living people
Melbourne Football Club (AFLW) players
Australian rules footballers from Melbourne
Sportswomen from Victoria (Australia)
Geelong Football Club (AFLW) players